Grayson "Mickey" Hajash (1925 - March 27, 2015) was a running back with the Calgary Stampeders in the Canadian Football League.

Hajash, perhaps the first CFL player born in Hungary, was a star with the Alberta Golden Bears. He played one season with the Stamps, including the 1949 Grey Cup. He later established the Grayson (Mickey) Hajash Athletic Award. An engineer, he had a long career in oil exploration.

References

Calgary Stampeders players
1925 births
University of Alberta alumni
Alberta Golden Bears football players
2015 deaths